Bucculatrix ochritincta is a species of moth in the family Bucculatricidae. It is found in North America, where it has been recorded from Maine and Tennessee. It was described by Annette Frances Braun in 1963.

References

Natural History Museum Lepidoptera generic names catalog

Bucculatricidae
Moths described in 1963
Moths of North America
Taxa named by Annette Frances Braun